The Shenzhen Vanke Rays were a women's ice hockey team that played in the 2017–18 season of the Canadian Women's Hockey League (CWHL). They were based in Shenzhen, Guangdong, China and played at the Shenzhen Dayun Arena. The team was developed along with the Kunlun Red Star WIH as part of the Chinese Ice Hockey Association (CIHA) in an effort to grow interest in ice hockey in China in preparation for the 2022 Winter Olympics in Beijing. Both teams debuted in the 2017–18 CWHL season. The general manager was Shirley Hon, who was named to the position on August 18, 2017.

In 2018, the CWHL contracted the Rays' membership after one season to focus solely on the Kunlun Red Star team in China. Shortly after, Kunlun Red Star was rebranded as the Shenzhen KRS Vanke Rays as the CWHL integrated the two teams.

History

Inaugural draft class
The following players were selected by the Rays in the 2017 CWHL Draft.

References

External links
  (Archived)

 
Ice hockey teams in China
Ice hockey clubs established in 2017
2017 establishments in China
Canadian Women's Hockey League teams
Women's ice hockey teams in Asia